Hattie N. Harrison (February 11, 1928 – January 28, 2013) was an American politician who served in the Maryland General Assembly from 1973. Harrison was the chairperson of the Maryland House of Delegates Rules and Executive Nominations Committee, and was the first African-American woman to chair a legislative committee in Maryland.

Background
Born in Lancaster, South Carolina, Harrison attended the Charlotte, North Carolina and Baltimore City public schools. She is a graduate of the Antioch College after which she became a teacher. She was a member of the Democratic State Central Committee, Baltimore City from 1970 to 1974, and a member of the Eastside Democratic Organization. In 2005, she received the Casper R. Taylor, Jr. Founder's Award from the Speaker's Society of the Maryland House of Delegates. Harrison died on January 28, 2013. At the time of her death, she was the longest serving delegate to the Maryland House of Delegates.

In the Legislature

At the time of her death, she had been a member of the Economic Matters Committee since 1973 and served on its science & technology subcommittee. She was a member of the Legislative Black Caucus of Maryland (formerly Maryland Legislative Black Caucus) and the Women's Legislators of Maryland.

Legislative notes
 voted for electric deregulation in 1999 (HB703)
 voted for income tax reduction in 1998 (SB750)
 voted for the Healthy Air Act in 2006 (SB154)
 voted in favor the Tax Reform Act of 2007 (HB2)

General election results, 2006
2006 Race for Maryland House of Delegates – 45th District
Voters to choose three:
{| class="wikitable"
|-
!Name
!Votes
!Percent
!Outcome
|-
|-
|Cheryl Glenn, Democratic
|16,911
|  32.6%
|   Won
|-
|-
|Hattie N. Harrison, Democratic
|16,804
|  31.0%
|   Won
|-
|-
|Talmadge Branch, Democratic
|16,014
|  30.9%
|   Won
|-
|-
|Ronald M. Owens-Bey, Populist
|2,727
|  5.3%
|   Lost
|-
|Other write-ins
|111
|  .2%
|   Lost
|-
|}

References

1928 births
2013 deaths
People from Lancaster, South Carolina
Politicians from Baltimore
Antioch College alumni
African-American state legislators in Maryland
African-American women in politics
Democratic Party members of the Maryland House of Delegates
Women state legislators in Maryland
21st-century American politicians
21st-century American women politicians
21st-century African-American women
21st-century African-American politicians
20th-century African-American people
20th-century African-American women